Mayara Fier de Moura (born 5 December 1986) is a Brazilian handballer. She is a member of the Brazilian national team and participated at the 2011 World Women's Handball Championship in Brazil and the 2012 Summer Olympics.

Titles
Pan American Women's Club Handball Championship:
2017

References

1986 births
Living people
Brazilian female handball players
Expatriate handball players
Brazilian expatriate sportspeople in Spain
Brazilian expatriate sportspeople in France
Brazilian expatriate sportspeople in Austria
Brazilian expatriate sportspeople in Denmark
Handball players at the 2011 Pan American Games
Handball players at the 2012 Summer Olympics
Handball players at the 2016 Summer Olympics
Olympic handball players of Brazil
Pan American Games gold medalists for Brazil
Pan American Games medalists in handball
People from Arapongas
Medalists at the 2011 Pan American Games
Sportspeople from Paraná (state)
21st-century Brazilian women